The 2009 Cornell Big Red football team was an American football team that represented Cornell University in the 2009 NCAA Division I FCS football season. They were led by sixth-year head coach Jim Knowles and played their home games at Schoellkopf Field. Cornell finished the season 2–8 overall and 1–6 in Ivy League play to place eighth. Cornell averaged 7,176 fans per game.

Schedule

Roster

References

Cornell
Cornell Big Red football seasons
Cornell Big Red football